Váckisújfalu is a village and commune in the comitatus of Pest in Hungary.

Populated places in Pest County